Sergei Nikolayevich Zhukov (born 8 May 1967) is a Russian professional football coach and a former player. He is the manager of FC Volga Ulyanovsk.

Club career
He made his professional debut in the Soviet Second League in 1984 for FC Rubin Kazan.

Honours
 Soviet Top League bronze: 1988, 1991.
 Russian Premier League runner-up: 1995.
 Soviet Cup finalist: 1988, 1989, 1991.
 Russian Cup winner: 1996 (played in the early stages of the 1995/96 tournament for FC Lokomotiv Moscow).

European club competitions
With FC Torpedo Moscow.

 European Cup Winners' Cup 1989–90: 3 games.
 UEFA Cup 1990–91: 6 games, 1 goal.

References

1967 births
Footballers from Kazan
Living people
Soviet footballers
FC Rubin Kazan players
Russian footballers
Russian expatriate footballers
Expatriate footballers in Bangladesh
Expatriate footballers in Germany
Russian football managers
FC Torpedo Moscow players
1. FSV Mainz 05 players
Abahani Limited (Dhaka) players
FC Lokomotiv Moscow players
FC Tyumen players
FC Tom Tomsk players
Soviet Top League players
Russian Premier League players
2. Bundesliga players
Russian expatriate sportspeople in Bangladesh
Association football midfielders
FC Saturn Ramenskoye managers
FC Iskra Smolensk players